Couchiching is a word derived from the Ojibwe term gojijiing meaning "inlet" that may refer to many things including the following:

Couchiching First Nation
Couchiching Institute on Public Affairs
Couchiching Terriers
Lake Couchiching
"Couchiching" (song), from Gordon Lightfoot's album Harmony